Toba Tek Singh is a subdivision (tehsil) of Toba Tek Singh District in the Punjab province of Pakistan. It is administratively subdivided into 32 Union Councils, three of which form the tehsil capital Toba Tek Singh.

The Tehsil is headed by Assistant Commissioner Mossawar Ahmad Khan Niazi from PMS.

History
The original Toba Tek Singh Tehsil was formed in 1900, then part of Jhang District, with Toba Tek Singh as its capital. In 1930, it became a district subdivision. In 1982, it became a district, the current Toba Tek Singh Tehsil is a subdivision of this district.

References

Toba Tek Singh District
Tehsils of Punjab, Pakistan